The 2013 season is Gangwon FC's fifth season in the K League Classic in South Korea. Gangwon FC is competing in K League Classic and Korean FA Cup.

Current squad

Out on loan

Transfer

2012–13 Winter

In:

 

Out:

2013 Summer

In:

Out:

Coaching staff

Match results

K League Classic

Regular season
All times are Korea Standard Time (KST) – UTC+9

League table

Results summary

Results by round

Relegation/Promotion Playoff

Gangwon FC lost 2–4 on aggregate and relegated 2014 K League Challenge.

Korean FA Cup

Squad statistics

Appearances
Statistics accurate as of match played 7 December 2013

Goals and assists

Discipline

References

Gangwon FC
2013